Murarai Government Polytechnic, is a government polytechnic located in Murarai, Birbhum district, West Bengal.

About college
This polytechnic is affiliated to the West Bengal State Council of Technical Education,  and recognised by AICTE, New Delhi. This polytechnic offers diploma courses in Electronics And Communication Engineering, Survey Engineering, And Computer Science And Technology. Sumit Roy, Lecturer in ETCE is the current Head of the Institution, whereas, Aritra Sinha, Lecturer in EIE is the Secretary of Academic Council of Murarai Government Polytechnic.

See also

References

External links
Official website WBSCTE
Murarai Government Polytechnic
http://www.polytechnic.wbtetsd.gov.in/muraraigovpoly

Universities and colleges in Birbhum district
Educational institutions established in 2015
2015 establishments in West Bengal
Technical universities and colleges in West Bengal